Mute Nights ) or Festival of Silent Film and Contemporary Music, is an annual film festival, which takes place in Odessa, Ukraine the third weekend of June,. organized by Ivan and Yuriy Lypa Charitable Foundation and State Film Agency of Ukraine. The festival's debut opening ceremonies were held at the Korobchinsky Art Center on June 18, 2010.

Mission
The festival is intended to aid in the popularization and reinterpretation of international silent film classics by means of contemporary music interpretations, performed by European guest-artists and Ukrainian musicians, and to restore a contemporary art context to the Ukrainian avant-garde films of  Alexander Dovzhenko, Dziga Vertov, Ivan Kavaleridze, Heorhiy Stabovyi and others.

Festival
The festival is an open air and runs for a two-day period at the moorage of Odessa yacht-club.
As the first Ukrainian films were created in Odessa, the city was chosen as the venue, where Festival takes place.

References

External links 
 
 Mute Nights Festival 2010 documentary
 Mute Nights Festival 2010 promo

Film festivals in Ukraine
Annual events in Ukraine